Thomas Edward Bray  (born April 30, 1954) is an American actor and writer perhaps best known for his role as Murray "Boz" Bozinsky in the detective TV series Riptide. He made his film debut in the slasher film The Prowler (1981) and later appeared in John Carpenter's Prince of Darkness (1987), and The Horror Show (1989). His work has been primarily in television, and his most recent credit was in 2012 on an episode of the TNT series Leverage. 

Bray was a drama teacher and also taught television studies.

Life and career
Bray was born and raised in Lawrenceville, New Jersey. His first television role was in the short-lived TV series Breaking Away as Cyril. Later on in the 1980s, he starred in the TV series Harry with Alan Arkin. In 1990, he did the voice of Wilbur Finletter in the cartoon series Attack of the Killer Tomatoes: The Animated Series and voices in other animated works.

His first feature film was in the 1981 film The Prowler. He has appeared in other films, like the comedy Burglar, director John Carpenter's  Prince of Darkness, DeepStar Six and The Horror Show. Bray appeared in the TV movie Lady Mobster.

He became a writer and producer for television, including Designing Women, Now and Again, Fired Up, and Nash Bridges.

He was a drama teacher at Five Oaks and Rachel Carson Middle School as well as taught television studies at Portland State University. He is the father to three children.

Bray retired from his teaching career in 2019 after 13 years.

Filmography

References

External links

Official Website

1954 births
Living people
American male film actors
American male television actors
American male voice actors
Male actors from New Jersey
People from Lawrence Township, Mercer County, New Jersey
Male actors from Portland, Oregon